Massanetta Springs is a census-designated place in Rockingham County, Virginia. The population as of the 2010 Census was 4,833.

References

Census-designated places in Rockingham County, Virginia
Census-designated places in Virginia